Swedru All Blacks F.C. is a professional  football club based in Swedru, Central Region, Ghana. The club are currently competing in the Poly Tank Division One League.

Their home stadium is the Swedru Sports Stadium.

History
They play their home games at Swedru Sports Stadium. The club is nicknamed Black Magicians, the club is fullnamed Swedru All Blacks Football Club. Japanese business tycoon and politician Toshihiro Iwasa has bought 70% shares in All Blacks and appointed his Korean partner Kwon Il Han as Chief Executive. Veteran coach Fred Osam Duodu has been appointed head coach, former chairman George Afriyie who now owns 20% shares is deputy CEO and ace football commentator Dan Kwaku Yeboah of Peace FM Fame is Communications Director.

Achievements
SWAG Cup: 1
 1997/98

Current squad
as of

Reserve squad

Staff
Chairman:  Toshihiro Iwasa

CEO: George Afriyie

Chief Executive:  Kwon Il Han

Head Coach: Fred Osam Duodu

Communications Director: Dan Kwaku Yeboah

References

External links
 Official Site

Football clubs in Ghana
Central Region (Ghana)